Time in Mozambique is given by a single time zone, officially denoted as Central Africa Time (CAT; UTC+02:00). Mozambique has never observed daylight saving time.

History 
Mozambique adopted UTC+02:00 (Central Africa Time; CAT) unofficially in 1903, and officially in 26 May 1911.

IANA time zone database 
In the IANA time zone database, Mozambique is given one zone in the file zone.tab – Africa/Maputo. "MZ" refers to the country's ISO 3166-1 alpha-2 country code. Data for Mozambique directly from zone.tab of the IANA time zone database; columns marked with * are the columns from zone.tab itself:

See also 
List of time zones by country
List of UTC time offsets

References

External links 
Current time in Mozambique at Time.is
Time in Mozambique at TimeAndDate.com

Time in Mozambique